Castleruddery Motte is a motte and National Monument located in County Wicklow, Ireland.

Location

History

The motte was built in the late 12th century after the Norman invasion of Ireland. The motte at Castleruddery is located close to an early church mentioned in the twelfth century which formed part of the diocesan lands of Glendalough. In the early 13th century it became part of an episcopal manor and was subsequently granted to
the Dean of St. Patrick's Cathedral, Dublin. A borough grew up in association with the manor, of which the motte formed a part.

Description

The motte guards a river crossing.

References

Archaeological sites in County Wicklow
National Monuments in County Wicklow